Haridaskati Union is a Union Parishad under Manirampur Upazila of Jessore District in the division of Khulna, Bangladesh. It has an area of 29.55 square kilometres and a population of 21,678.

References

Unions of Manirampur Upazila
Unions of Jessore District
Unions of Khulna Division